Waterville Triangle Historic District is a national historic district located at Waterville in Oneida County, New York. The district includes 59 contributing buildings and encompasses the heart of the village where three streets intersect to form a triangle.  It includes buildings with a wide variety of architectural styles and whose worthy historical buildings span the period from 1820 to 1900.

It was listed on the National Register of Historic Places in 1978.

References

Historic districts in Oneida County, New York
Historic districts on the National Register of Historic Places in New York (state)
National Register of Historic Places in Oneida County, New York